Language movement or Language Movement may refer to:

Language campaigns 
 Plain Language Movement, a campaign to make writing easy to read, understand, and use
 Language revitalization, attempts by interested parties to reverse the decline of a language that is endangered, moribund, or extinct
 Linguistic purism, the practice of defining one variety of a language as being purer than other varieties
 Language secessionism, an attitude supporting the separation of a language variety from other forms of the language in order to make it a distinct language

Language-specific social and political movements
 Afrikaans language movement, originating in late 19th century South Africa
 Andalusian language movement, a fringe movement promoting Andalusian as an independent language separate from Spanish, with attempts at standardizing Andalusian
 Baloch independence movement, a movement that claims the Baloch people, an ethno-linguistic group mainly found in Pakistan, Iran and Afghanistan, are a distinct nation
 Bengali language movement, a political movement in former East Pakistan (currently Bangladesh) advocating the recognition of the Bengali language as an official language of the then-Dominion of Pakistan
 Bengali language movement in India, a campaign to preserve Bengali language and Bengalis culture in India
 English-only movement, a political movement to use English as the only language in official government operations in the United States of America
 Gaelic revival, the late-nineteenth-century national revival of interest in the Irish language and Irish Gaelic culture
 Language Freedom Movement, an organization opposing the state-sponsored revival of the Irish language
 Illyrian movement, a pan-South-Slavist cultural and political campaign during the first half of the 19th century
Kamtapur language movement, A linguistic campaign for Kamtapuri or Rajbanshi language in Jalpaiguri, Cooch Behar districts of West Bengal; Jharkhand and Bihar, India.
 Meitei language movement (also known as Manipuri language movement)
 Meitei linguistic purism movement, an ongoing linguistic movement, aimed to attain linguistic purism in Meitei language 
 Scheduled language movement, a historical linguistic movement in Northeast India, aimed at the recognition of Meitei language as one of the official languages of the Indian Republic
 Meitei classical language movement, an ongoing linguistic movement in Northeast India, aimed at the recognition of Meitei language as a "classical language"
 Meitei associate official language movement, a semi active linguistic movement in Northeast India, aimed at the recognition of Meitei language as an "associate" official language of Assam 
 Nepal Bhasa movement, a movement for linguistic rights of Nepal Bhasa speakers in Nepal
 Nepali language movement, a movement for linguistic rights of Nepali language speakers in India
 Norwegian language conflict, an ongoing controversy within Norwegian culture and politics related to spoken and written Norwegian
 Punjabi Language Movement, a linguistic movement in Punjab, Pakistan aimed at reviving Punjabi language, art, and culture
 Rajasthani language movement, a campaign for greater recognition for the Rajasthani language
 Reintegrationism, a linguistic and cultural movement in Galicia which views Galician and Portuguese as a single language
 Scandinavian movement, literary and political movements that support various degrees of cooperation among the Scandinavian or Nordic countries
 Urdu movement, a socio-political movement aimed at making Urdu the universal language and symbol of the cultural and political identity of the Muslim communities of the Indian subcontinent

Linguistic theory 
 Movement (sign language), the distinctive hand actions that form words in sign languages
 Syntactic movement, the means by which some theories of syntax address discontinuities
 Tough movement, theories about the movement of certain types of objects in formal syntax
 Wh-movement, a mechanism of syntax that helps express a question.

See also
Language Movement Day, a national day of Bangladesh to commemorate the Bengali Language Movement